Jiří Vaněk may refer to:

 Jiří Vaněk (rower), Czechoslovak competitor
 Jiří Vaněk (tennis) (born 1978)
 Jiří Vaněk (scientist), described Bornholmaspis in 1983